The Steindachner's sea catfish (Cathorops steindachneri) is a species of catfish in the family Ariidae. It was described by Charles Henry Gilbert and Edwin Chapin Starks in 1904. It is a tropical, marine and freshwater-dwelling catfish which occurs between Costa Rica and Peru.

The fish is named in honor of Austrian ichthyologist Franz Steindachner.

Due to insufficient statistical information on the species, the IUCN redlist lists the Steindachner's sea catfish as Data Deficient. It notes that pollution and coastal development pose a threat for the species. It is marketed commercially, although its small size makes it an uncommon food fish.

References

Ariidae
Taxa named by Charles Henry Gilbert
Taxa named by Edwin Chapin Starks
Fish described in 1904